Lansing Community College is a public community college with its main campus in Lansing, Michigan. Founded in 1957, the college's main campus is located on an urban,  site in downtown Lansing spanning seven city blocks approximately two blocks from the state capitol. A West Campus opened in 2004 in Delta Township, southwest of Lansing.  There is also an East Campus located in the Eyde Plaza in East Lansing. The school is the third largest community college in Michigan by enrollment, with a fall 2013 enrollment of 18,551, a decrease from 20,394 in 2008.

History
The college was founded in 1957 by Philip Gannon who served as president between 1957 and 1989.

Academics 
Lansing Community College (LCC) offers 230 associate degree and certificate programs while offering approximately 1,150 courses each academic year. It is accredited by the Higher Learning Commission.

LCC is also a National Alternative Fuels Training Consortium Training Center. Most of the classes in this center are located at the college's West Campus.

Athletics
The LCC Athletic Department fields nine intercollegiate teams. The Lansing Community College Stars play in the Michigan Community College Athletic Association, and is a member of the National Junior College Athletic Association.

Lansing Community College intercollegiate sports include:
 Fall - Men's and Women's Cross Country, Women's Volleyball
 Winter - Men's and Women's Basketball
 Spring - Men's and Women's Track and Field, Softball, Baseball

LCC also has a competitive club hockey team that participates in the American Collegiate Hockey Association and the Michigan Collegiate Hockey Conference.

Notable alumni

Lingg Brewer, politician and educator
Pamela Ditchoff, author
Thom Hartmann, talk show host, author, businessman, and progressive political commentator
Nate Huffman, professional basketball player, 2001 Israeli Basketball Premier League MVP
Sabah Khoury, international basketball player
Lisa McClain, politician
 Marcus Norris (born 1974), basketball player, 2003-04 Israeli Basketball Premier League Defensive Player of the Year
Paul Michael Stoll (born 1985), American-Mexican basketball player

References

External links
 Official site

Community colleges in Michigan
Two-year colleges in the United States
Michigan Community College Athletic Association
Education in Lansing, Michigan
Education in Eaton County, Michigan
Educational institutions established in 1957
1957 establishments in Michigan
Universities and colleges in Ingham County, Michigan
NJCAA athletics